Thales Gustavo Hoss (born 27 April 1989) is a Brazilian professional volleyball player. He is a member of the Brazil national team, a silver medallist at the 2018 World Championship, 2019 World Cup winner, and a two–time South American Champion (2017, 2019). At the professional club level, he plays for Chaumont VB 52.

Honours

Clubs
 CSV South American Club Championship
  Florianópolis 2009 – with Cimed Florianópolis
  Argentina 2010 – with Cimed Florianópolis
 National championships
 2009/2010  Brazilian Championship – with Cimed Florianópolis
 2018/2019  Brazilian Championship – with Vôlei Taubaté
 2019/2020  Brazilian SuperCup, with Vôlei Taubaté
 2020/2021  Brazilian SuperCup, with Vôlei Taubaté

Youth national team
 2006  CSV U19 South American Championship
 2008  CSV U21 South American Championship
 2009  FIVB U21 World Championship

Individual awards
 2006: CSV U19 South American Championship – Best Libero
 2006: CSV U19 South American Championship – Best Receiver
 2006: CSV U19 South American Championship – Best Digger
 2010: CSV South American Club Championship – Best Receiver
 2010: CSV South American Club Championship – Best Libero
 2019: FIVB World Cup – Best Libero
 2021: FIVB Nations League – Best Libero

External links
 
 
 
 Player profile at Volleybox.net

1989 births
Living people
People from São Leopoldo
Sportspeople from Rio Grande do Sul
Brazilian men's volleyball players
Olympic volleyball players of Brazil
Volleyball players at the 2020 Summer Olympics
Brazilian expatriate sportspeople in France
Expatriate volleyball players in France
Liberos